Euphrase Kezilahabi (13 April 1944 – 9 January 2020) was a Tanzanian novelist, poet, and scholar. Born in Ukerewe, Tanganyika (now in Tanzania), he last worked at the University of Botswana, as an associate professor at the Department of African Languages (now African Cultural Department).

He wrote in Swahili, and delivered talks on subjects such as 'Aesthetic Ambivalence in Modern Swahili' and 'The Concept of the Hero in African Fiction'.

Works
 Stray Truths: Selected Poems of Euphrase Kezilahabi (Translations by Annmarie Drury) - 2015' Mzingile - 1991
 Nagona - 1990
 Karibu Ndani - 1988
 Rosa Mistika - 1988
Dunia Uwanja wa Fujo (2007)
Kichwamaji (1974)
Gamba la Nyoka (2006)
 The Concept of the Hero in African Fiction'' - 1983
 Translations by the Poetry Translation Centre.

Influenced 

 Vincent R. Ogoti

References

1944 births
2020 deaths
Tanzanian educators
Tanzanian poets
Swahili-language writers